Parliamentary elections were held in Greece on 26 January 1936. The Liberal Party emerged as the largest party in Parliament, winning 126 of the 300 seats.

Results

See also
4th of August Regime

References

Parliamentary elections in Greece
Greece
Legislative election
1930s in Greek politics
Eleftherios Venizelos
History of Greece (1924–1941)
Greece
Election and referendum articles with incomplete results
Legl